Nam Kyung-jin (Korean: 남경진, born 25 August 1988) is a South Korean freestyle wrestler. He won one of the bronze medals at the Asian Games both in 2014 and in 2018 in the men's 125 kg event.

In 2020, he won one of the bronze medals in the 125 kg event at the Asian Wrestling Championships held in New Delhi, India.

In 2023, Nam appeared as a contestant in Netflix's reality Show, Physical: 100.

Achievements

References

External links 

 

Living people
1988 births
Place of birth missing (living people)
South Korean male sport wrestlers
Wrestlers at the 2014 Asian Games
Wrestlers at the 2018 Asian Games
Medalists at the 2014 Asian Games
Medalists at the 2018 Asian Games
Asian Games medalists in wrestling
Asian Games bronze medalists for South Korea
Asian Wrestling Championships medalists
21st-century South Korean people